Kentucky Route 120 (KY 120) is a  state highway in Kentucky. It runs from U.S. Route 60 (US 60) and KY 91 in Marion to KY 138 and Main Cross Street in Slaughters via Providence.

Major intersections

References

0120
Transportation in Crittenden County, Kentucky
Transportation in Webster County, Kentucky